Muhi al-Din Muhammad (– 3 March 1707), commonly known as  and by his regnal title Alamgir, was the sixth emperor of the Mughal Empire, ruling from July 1658 until his death in 1707. Under his emperorship, the Mughals reached their greatest extent with their territory spanning nearly the entirety of Indian subcontinent.

Widely considered to be the last effective Mughal ruler, Aurangzeb compiled the Fatawa 'Alamgiri and was amongst the few monarchs to have fully established Sharia and Islamic economics throughout the Indian subcontinent.

Belonging to the aristocratic Timurid dynasty, Aurangzeb's early life was occupied with pious pursuits. He held administrative and military posts under his father Shah Jahan and gained recognition as an accomplished military commander. Aurangzeb served as the viceroy of the Deccan in 1636–1637 and the governor of Gujarat in 1645–1647. He jointly administrated the provinces of Multan and Sindh in 1648–1652 and continued expeditions into the neighboring Safavid territories. In September 1657, Shah Jahan nominated his eldest and liberalist son Dara Shikoh as his successor, a move repudiated by Aurangzeb, who proclaimed himself emperor in February 1658. In April 1658, Aurangzeb defeated the allied army of Shikoh and the Kingdom of Marwar at the battle of Dharmat. Aurangzeb's decisive victory at the battle of Samugarh in May 1658 cemented his sovereignty and his suzerainty was acknowledged throughout the Empire. After Shah Jahan recovered from illness in July 1658, Aurangzeb declared him incompetent to rule and imprisoned his father in the Agra Fort.

Under Aurangzeb's emperorship, the Mughals reached its greatest extent with their territory spanning nearly the entire Indian subcontinent. His reign is characterized by a period of rapid military expansion, with several dynasties and states being overthrown by the Mughals. His conquests acquired him the regnal title Alamgir ('Conqueror'). The Mughals also surpassed Qing China as the world's largest economy and biggest manufacturing power. The Mughal military gradually improved and became one of the strongest armies in the world. A staunch Muslim, Aurangzeb is credited with the construction of numerous mosques and patronizing works of Arabic calligraphy. He successfully imposed the Fatawa 'Alamgiri as the principal regulating body of the empire and prohibited religiously forbidden activities in Islam. Although Aurangzeb suppressed several local revolts, he maintained cordial relations with foreign governments.

Aurangzeb is generally considered by Islamic historians to be one of the greatest emperors of the Mughals. While there is considerable admiration for Aurangzeb in the contemporary sources, he has been criticized for his executions and demolition of Hindu temples. Furthermore, his Islamization of the region, introduction of the Jizya tax and abandonment of un-Islamic practices caused resentment among non-Muslims. Aurangzeb is commemorated by Muslims as a just ruler and the Mujaddid (centennial reviver) of the 11th–12th Islamic century.

Early life

His father was Emperor Shah Jahan, who hailed from the Mughal house of the Timurid dynasty. The latter was descended from Emir Timur, the founder of the Timurid Empire. Aurangzeb's mother Mumtaz Mahal was the daughter of the Persian noblemen Asaf Khan, who was the youngest son of vizier Mirza Ghiyas. Aurangzeb was born during the reign of his patrilineal grandfather Jahangir, the fourth emperor of the Mughal Empire.

In June 1626, after an unsuccessful rebellion by his father, eight-year-old Aurangzeb and his brother Dara Shikoh were sent to the Mughal court in Lahore as hostages of their grandfather Jahangir and his wife, Nur Jahan, as part of their father's pardon deal. After Jahangir died in 1627, Shah Jahan emerged victorious in the ensuing war of succession to the Mughal throne. Aurangzeb and his brother were consequently reunited with Shah Jahan in Agra.

Aurangzeb received a Mughal princely education covering subjects like combat, military strategy, and administration. His curriculum also included scholarly areas like Islamic studies and Turkic and Persian literature. Aurangzeb grew up fluent in the Hindi of his time.

On 28 May 1633, Aurangzeb escaped death when a powerful war elephant stampeded through the Mughal imperial encampment. He rode against the elephant and struck its trunk with a lance, and successfully defended himself from being crushed. Aurangzeb's valour was appreciated by his father who conferred him the title of Bahadur (Brave) and had him weighed in gold and presented gifts worth Rs. 200,000. This event was celebrated in Persian and Urdu verses, and Aurangzeb said:

Early military campaigns and administration

Bundela War

Aurangzeb was nominally in charge of the force sent to Bundelkhand with the intent of subduing the rebellious ruler of Orchha, Jhujhar Singh, who had attacked another territory in defiance of Shah Jahan's policy and was refusing to atone for his actions. By arrangement, Aurangzeb stayed in the rear, away from the fighting, and took the advice of his generals as the Mughal Army gathered and commenced the siege of Orchha in 1635. The campaign was successful and Singh was removed from power.

Viceroy of the Deccan

Aurangzeb was appointed viceroy of the Deccan in 1636. After Shah Jahan's vassals had been devastated by the alarming expansion of Ahmednagar during the reign of the Nizam Shahi boy-prince Murtaza Shah III, the emperor dispatched Aurangzeb, who in 1636 brought the Nizam Shahi dynasty to an end. In 1637, Aurangzeb married the Safavid princess Dilras Banu, posthumously known as Rabia-ud-Daurani. She was his first wife and chief consort as well as his favourite. He also had an infatuation with a slave girl, Hira Bai, whose death at a young age greatly affected him. In his old age, he was under the charms of his concubine, Udaipuri Mahal. The latter had formerly been a companion to Dara Shukoh. In the same year, 1637, Aurangzeb was placed in charge of annexing the small Rajput kingdom of Baglana, which he did with ease. In 1638, Aurangzeb married Nawab Bai, later known as Rahmat al-Nisa. That same year, Aurangzeb dispatched an army to subdue the Portuguese coastal fortress of Daman, however his forces met stubborn resistance and were eventually repulsed at the end of a long siege. At some point, Aurangzeb married Aurangabadi Mahal, who was a Circassian or Georgian.

In 1644, Aurangzeb's sister, Jahanara, was burned when the chemicals in her perfume were ignited by a nearby lamp while in Agra. This event precipitated a family crisis with political consequences. Aurangzeb suffered his father's displeasure by not returning to Agra immediately but rather three weeks later. Shah Jahan had been nursing Jahanara back to health in that time and thousands of vassals had arrived in Agra to pay their respects. Shah Jahan was outraged to see Aurangzeb enter the interior palace compound in military attire and immediately dismissed him from his position of viceroy of the Deccan; Aurangzeb was also no longer allowed to use red tents or to associate himself with the official military standard of the Mughal emperor. Other sources tell us that Aurangzeb was dismissed from his position because Aurangzeb left the life of luxury and became a faqir.

Governor of Gujarat

In 1645, he was barred from the court for seven months and mentioned his grief to fellow Mughal commanders. Thereafter, Shah Jahan appointed him governor of Gujarat. His rule in Gujarat was marked with religious disputes but he was rewarded for bringing stability.

Governor of Balkh
In 1647, Shah Jahan moved Aurangzeb from Gujarat to be governor of Balkh, replacing a younger son, Murad Baksh, who had proved ineffective there. The area was under attack from Uzbek and Turkmen tribes. While the Mughal artillery and muskets were a formidable force, so too were the skirmishing skills of their opponents. The two sides were in stalemate and Aurangzeb discovered that his army could not live off the land, which was devastated by war. With the onset of winter, he and his father had to make a largely unsatisfactory deal with the Uzbeks, giving away territory in exchange for nominal recognition of Mughal sovereignty. The Mughal force suffered still further with attacks by Uzbeks and other tribesmen as it retreated through the snow to Kabul. By the end of this two-year campaign, into which Aurangzeb had been plunged at a late stage, a vast sum of money had been expended for little gain.

Further inauspicious military involvements followed, as Aurangzeb was appointed governor of Multan and Sindh. His efforts in 1649 and 1652 to dislodge the Safavids at Kandahar, which they had recently retaken after a decade of Mughal control, both ended in failure as winter approached. The logistical problems of supplying an army at the extremity of the empire, combined with the poor quality of armaments and the intransigence of the opposition have been cited by John Richards as the reasons for failure, and a third attempt in 1653, led by Dara Shikoh, met with the same outcome.

2nd term as Viceroy of the Deccan

Aurangzeb became viceroy of the Deccan again after he was replaced by Dara Shukoh in the attempt to recapture Kandahar. Aurangzeb regretted this and harboured feelings that Shikoh had manipulated the situation to serve his own ends. Aurangbad's two jagirs (land grants) were moved there as a consequence of his return and, because the Deccan was a relatively impoverished area, this caused him to lose out financially. So poor was the area that grants were required from Malwa and Gujarat in order to maintain the administration and the situation caused ill-feeling between father and son. Shah Jahan insisted that things could be improved if Aurangzeb made efforts to develop cultivation. Aurangzeb appointed Murshid Quli Khan to extend to the Deccan the zabt revenue system used in northern India. Murshid Quli Khan organised a survey of agricultural land and a tax assessment on what it produced. To increase revenue, Murshid Quli Khan granted loans for seed, livestock, and irrigation infrastructure. The Deccan returned to prosperity,

Aurangzeb proposed to resolve the situation by attacking the dynastic occupants of Golconda (the Qutb Shahis) and Bijapur (the Adil Shahis). As an adjunct to resolving the financial difficulties, the proposal would also extend Mughal influence by accruing more lands. Aurangzeb advanced against the Sultan of Bijapur and besieged Bidar. The Kiladar (governor or captain) of the fortified city, Sidi Marjan, was mortally wounded when a gunpowder magazine exploded. After twenty-seven days of hard fighting, Bidar was captured by the Mughals and Aurangzeb continued his advance. Again, he was to feel that Dara had exerted influence on his father: believing that he was on the verge of victory in both instances, Aurangzeb was frustrated that Shah Jahan chose then to settle for negotiations with the opposing forces rather than pushing for complete victory.

War of succession

The four sons of Shah Jahan all held governorships during their father's reign. The emperor favoured the eldest, Dara Shikoh. This had caused resentment among the younger three, who sought at various times to strengthen alliances between themselves and against Dara. There was no Mughal tradition of primogeniture, the systematic passing of rule, upon an emperor's death, to his eldest son. Instead it was customary for sons to overthrow their father and for brothers to war to the death among themselves. Historian Satish Chandra says that "In the ultimate resort, connections among the powerful military leaders, and military strength and capacity [were] the real arbiters". The contest for power was primarily between Dara Shikoh and Aurangzeb because, although all four sons had demonstrated competence in their official roles, it was around these two that the supporting cast of officials and other influential people mostly circulated. There were ideological differences — Dara was an intellectual and a religious liberal in the mould of Akbar, while Aurangzeb was much more conservative — but, as historians Barbara D. Metcalf and Thomas R. Metcalf say, "To focus on divergent philosophies neglects the fact that Dara was a poor general and leader. It also ignores the fact that factional lines in the succession dispute were not, by and large, shaped by ideology." Marc Gaborieau, professor of Indian studies at l'École des Hautes Études en Sciences Sociales, explains that "The loyalties of [officials and their armed contingents] seem to have been motivated more by their own interests, the closeness of the family relation and above all the charisma of the pretenders than by ideological divides." Muslims and Hindus did not divide along religious lines in their support for one pretender or the other nor, according to Chandra, is there much evidence to support the belief that Jahanara and other members of the royal family were split in their support. Jahanara, certainly, interceded at various times on behalf of all of the princes and was well-regarded by Aurangzeb even though she shared the religious outlook of Dara.

In 1656, a general under Qutb Shahi dynasty named Musa Khan led an army of 12,000 musketeers to attack Aurangzeb, who was besieging Golconda Fort. Later in the same campaign, Aurangzeb, in turn, rode against an army consisting of 8,000 horsemen and 20,000 Karnataki musketeers.

Having made clear that he wanted Dara to succeed him, Shah Jahan became ill with stranguary in 1657 and was closeted under the care of his favourite son in the newly built city of Shahjahanabad (Old Delhi). Rumours of the death of Shah Jahan abounded and the younger sons were concerned that Dara might be hiding it for Machiavellian reasons. Thus, they took action: Shah Shuja In Bengal, where he had been governor since 1637, Prince Muhammad Shuja crowned himself King at RajMahal, and brought his cavalry, artillery and river flotilla upriver towards Agra. Near Varanasi his forces confronted a defending army sent from Delhi under the command of Prince Sulaiman Shukoh, son of Dara Shukoh, and Raja Jai Singh while Murad did the same in his governorship of Gujarat and Aurangzeb did so in the Deccan. It is not known whether these preparations were made in the mistaken belief that the rumours of death were true or whether the challengers were just taking advantage of the situation.

After regaining some of his health, Shah Jahan moved to Agra and Dara urged him to send forces to challenge Shah Shuja and Murad, who had declared themselves rulers in their respective territories. While Shah Shuja was defeated at Banares in February 1658, the army sent to deal with Murad discovered to their surprise that he and Aurangzeb had combined their forces, the two brothers having agreed to partition the empire once they had gained control of it. The two armies clashed at Dharmat in April 1658, with Aurangzeb being the victor. Shuja was being chased through Bihar and the victory of Aurangzeb proved this to be a poor decision by Dara Shikoh, who now had a defeated force on one front and a successful force unnecessarily pre-occupied on another. Realising that his recalled Bihar forces would not arrive at Agra in time to resist the emboldened Aurangzeb's advance, Dara scrambled to form alliances in order but found that Aurangzeb had already courted key potential candidates. When Dara's disparate, hastily concocted army clashed with Aurangzeb's well-disciplined, battle-hardened force at the battle of Samugarh in late May, neither Dara's men nor his generalship were any match for Aurangzeb. Dara had also become over-confident in his own abilities and, by ignoring advice not to lead in battle while his father was alive, he cemented the idea that he had usurped the throne. "After the defeat of Dara, Shah Jahan was imprisoned in the fort of Agra where he spent eight long years under the care of his favourite daughter Jahanara."

Aurangzeb then broke his arrangement with Murad Baksh, which probably had been his intention all along. Instead of looking to partition the empire between himself and Murad, he had his brother arrested and imprisoned at Gwalior Fort. Murad was executed on 4 December 1661, ostensibly for the murder of the diwan of Gujarat sometime earlier. The allegation was encouraged by Aurangzeb, who caused the diwan's son to seek retribution for the death under the principles of Sharia law. Meanwhile, Dara gathered his forces, and moved to the Punjab. The army sent against Shuja was trapped in the east, its generals Jai Singh and Dilir Khan submitted to Aurangzeb, but Dara's son, Suleiman Shikoh, escaped. Aurangzeb offered Shah Shuja the governorship of Bengal. This move had the effect of isolating Dara Shikoh and causing more troops to defect to Aurangzeb. Shah Shuja, who had declared himself emperor in Bengal began to annex more territory and this prompted Aurangzeb to march from Punjab with a new and large army that fought during the battle of Khajwa, where Shah Shuja and his chain-mail armoured war elephants were routed by the forces loyal to Aurangzeb. Shah Shuja then fled to Arakan (in present-day Burma), where he was executed by the local rulers.

With Shuja and Murad disposed of, and with his father immured in Agra, Aurangzeb pursued Dara Shikoh, chasing him across the north-western bounds of the empire. Aurangzeb claimed that Dara was no longer a Muslim  and accused him of poisoning the Mughal Grand Vizier Saadullah Khan. After a series of battles, defeats and retreats, Dara was betrayed by one of his generals, who arrested and bound him. In 1658, Aurangzeb arranged his formal coronation in Delhi.

On 10 August 1659, Dara was executed on grounds of apostasy and his head was sent to Shahjahan. The first prominent execution of Aurangzeb was that of his brother Prince Dara Shikoh, who was accused of being influenced by Hinduism although some sources argue it was done for political reasons. Aurangzeb had his allied brother Prince Murad Baksh held for murder, judged and then executed. Aurangzeb is accused of poisoning his imprisoned nephew Sulaiman Shikoh. Having secured his position, Aurangzeb confined his frail father at the Agra Fort but did not mistreat him. Shah Jahan was cared for by Jahanara and died in 1666.

Reign

Bureaucracy

Aurangzeb's imperial bureaucracy employed significantly more Hindus than that of his predecessors.

Between 1679 and 1707, the number of Hindu officials in the Mughal administration rose by half, to represent 31.6% of Mughal nobility, the highest in the Mughal era. Many of them were Marathas and Rajputs, who were his political allies. However, Aurangzeb encouraged high ranking Hindu officials to convert to Islam.

Economy 
Under his reign, the Mughal Empire contributed to the world's GDP by nearly 25%, surpassing Qing China, making it the world's largest economy and biggest manufacturing power, more than the entirety of Western Europe, and its largest and wealthiest subdivision, the Bengal Subah, signaled proto-industrialization.

Establishment of Islamic law

Aurangzeb was an orthodox Muslim ruler. Subsequent to the policies of his three predecessors, he endeavored to make Islam a dominant force in his reign. However these efforts brought him into conflict with the forces that were opposed to this revival. Aurangzeb was a follower of the Mujaddidi Order and a disciple of the son of the Punjabi saint, Ahmad Sirhindi. He sought to establish Islamic rule as instructed and inspired by him.

Historian Katherine Brown has noted that "The very name of Aurangzeb seems to act in the popular imagination as a signifier of politico-religious bigotry and repression, regardless of historical accuracy." The subject has also resonated in modern times with popularly accepted claims that he intended to destroy the Bamiyan Buddhas. As a political and religious conservative, Aurangzeb chose not to follow the secular-religious viewpoints of his predecessors after his ascension. He made no mention of the Persian concept of kinship, the Farr-i-Aizadi, and based his rule on the Quranic concept of kingship. Shah Jahan had already moved away from the liberalism of Akbar, although in a token manner rather than with the intent of suppressing Hinduism, and Aurangzeb took the change still further. Though the approach to faith of Akbar, Jahangir and Shah Jahan was more syncretic than Babur, the founder of the empire, Aurangzeb's position is not so obvious.

His emphasis on sharia competed, or was directly in conflict, with his insistence that zawabit or secular decrees could supersede sharia. The chief qazi refusing to crown him in 1659, Aurangzeb had a political need to present himself as a "defender of the sharia" due to popular opposition to his actions against his father and brothers. Despite claims of sweeping edicts and policies, contradictory accounts exist. Historian Katherine Brown has argued that Aurangzeb never imposed a complete ban on music. He sought to codify Hanafi law by the work of several hundred jurists, called Fatawa 'Alamgiri. It is possible the War of Succession and continued incursions combined with Shah Jahan's spending made cultural expenditure impossible.

He learnt that at Multan, Thatta, and particularly at Varanasi, the teachings of Hindu Brahmins attracted numerous Muslims. He ordered the subahdars of these provinces to demolish the schools and the temples of non-Muslims. Aurangzeb also ordered subahdars to punish Muslims who dressed like non-Muslims. The executions of the antinomian Sufi mystic Sarmad Kashani and the ninth Sikh Guru Tegh Bahadur bear testimony to Aurangzeb's religious policy; the former was beheaded on multiple accounts of heresy, the latter, according to Sikhs, because he objected to Aurangzeb's forced conversions. Aurangzeb had also banned the celebration of the Zoroastrian festival of Nauroz along with other un-Islamic ceremonies, and encouraged conversions to Islam; instances of persecution against particular Muslim factions were also reported.

Taxation policy
Shortly after coming to power, Aurangzeb remitted more than 80 long-standing taxes affecting all of his subjects.
In 1679, Aurangzeb chose to re-impose jizya, a military tax on non-Muslim subjects in lieu of military service, after an abatement for a span of hundred years, in what was critiqued by many Hindu rulers, family-members of Aurangzeb, and Mughal court-officials. The specific amount varied with the socioeconomic status of a subject and tax-collection were often waived for regions hit by calamities; also, Brahmins, women, children, elders, the handicapped, the unemployed, the ill, and the insane were all perpetually exempted. The collectors were mandated to be Muslims. A majority of modern scholars reject that religious bigotry influenced the imposition; rather, realpolitik — economic constraints as a result of multiple ongoing battles and establishment of credence with the orthodox Ulemas — are held to be primary agents.

Aurangzeb also enforced a higher tax burden on Hindu merchants at the rate of 5% (as against 2.5% on Muslim merchants), which led to considerable dislike of Aurangzeb's economic policies; a sharp turn from Akbar's uniform tax code. According to Marc Jason Gilbert, Aurangzeb ordered the jizya fees to be paid in person, in front of a tax collector, where the non Muslims were to recite a verse in the Quran which referred to their inferior status as non Muslims. This decision led to protests and lamentations among the masses as well as Hindu court officials. In order to meet state expenditures, Aurangzeb had ordered increases in land taxes; the burden of which fell heavily upon the Hindu Jats. The reimposition of the jizya encouraged Hindus to flee to areas under East India Company jurisdiction, under which policies of religious sufferance and pretermissions of religious taxes prevailed.

Policy on temples and mosques

Aurangzeb issued land grants and provided funds for the maintenance of shrines of worship but also (often) ordered their destruction. Modern historians reject the thought-school of colonial and nationalist historians about these destruction being guided by religious zealotry; rather, the association of temples with sovereignty, power and authority is emphasized upon.

Whilst constructing mosques were considered an act of royal duty to subjects, there are also several firmans in Aurangzeb's name, supporting temples, maths, chishti shrines, and gurudwaras, including Mahakaleshwar temple of Ujjain, a gurudwara at Dehradun, Balaji temple of Chitrakoot, Umananda Temple of Guwahati and the Shatrunjaya Jain temples, among others. Numerous new temples were built, as well.

Contemporary court-chronicles mention hundreds of temple which were demolished by Aurangzab or his chieftains, upon his order. In September 1669, he ordered the destruction of Vishvanath Temple at Varanasi, which was established by Raja Man Singh, whose grandson Jai Singh was believed to have facilitated Shivaji's escape. After the Jat rebellion in Mathura (early 1670), which killed the patron of the town-mosque, Aurangzeb suppressed the rebels and ordered for the city's Kesava Deo temple to be demolished, and replaced with an Eidgah. In 1672–73, Aurangzeb ordered the resumption of all grants held by Hindus throughout the empire, though this was not followed absolutely in regions such as Gujarat, where lands granted in in'am to Charans were not affected. In around 1679, he ordered destruction of several prominent temples, including those of Khandela, Udaipur, Chittor and Jodhpur, which were patronaged by rebels. The Jama Masjid at Golkunda was similarly treated, after it was found that its ruler had built it to hide revenues from the state; however desecration of mosques are rare due to their complete lack of political capital contra temples.

In an order specific to Benaras, Aurangzeb invokes Sharia to declare that Hindus will be granted state-protection and temples won't be razed (but prohibits construction of any new temple); other orders to similar effect can be located. Richard Eaton, upon a critical evaluation of primary sources, counts 15 temples to have been destroyed during Aurangzeb's reign. Ian Copland and others reiterate Iqtidar Alam Khan who notes that, overall, Aurangzeb built more temples than he destroyed.

Execution of opponents
In 1689, the second Maratha Chhatrapati (King) Sambhaji was brutally executed by Aurangzeb. In a sham trial, he was found guilty of murder and violence, atrocities against the Muslims of Burhanpur and Bahadurpur in Berar by Marathas under his command.

In 1675 the 9th Sikh Guru Tegh Bahadur was arrested on orders by Aurangzeb and later execute after he refused to Convert in Islam,

The 32nd Da'i al-Mutlaq (Absolute Missionary) of the Dawoodi Bohra sect of Musta'lī Islam Syedna Qutubkhan Qutubuddin was executed by Aurangzeb, then governor of Gujarat, for heresy; on 27 Jumadil Akhir 1056 AH (1648 AD), Ahmedabad, India.

Expansion of the Mughal Empire

In 1663, during his visit to Ladakh, Aurangzeb established direct control over that part of the empire and loyal subjects such as Deldan Namgyal agreed to pledge tribute and loyalty. Deldan Namgyal is also known to have constructed a Grand Mosque in Leh, which he dedicated to Mughal rule.

In 1664, Aurangzeb appointed Shaista Khan subedar (governor) of Bengal. Shaista Khan eliminated Portuguese and Arakanese pirates from the region, and in 1666 recaptured the port of Chittagong from the Arakanese king, Sanda Thudhamma. Chittagong remained a key port throughout Mughal rule.

In 1685, Aurangzeb dispatched his son, Muhammad Azam Shah, with a force of nearly 50,000 men to capture Bijapur Fort and defeat Sikandar Adil Shah (the ruler of Bijapur) who refused to be a vassal. The Mughals could not make any advancements upon Bijapur Fort, mainly because of the superior usage of cannon batteries on both sides. Outraged by the stalemate Aurangzeb himself arrived on 4 September 1686 and commanded the siege of Bijapur; after eight days of fighting, the Mughals were victorious.

Only one remaining ruler, Abul Hasan Qutb Shah (the Qutbshahi ruler of Golconda), refused to surrender. He and his servicemen fortified themselves at Golconda and fiercely protected the Kollur Mine, which was then probably the world's most productive diamond mine, and an important economic asset. In 1687, Aurangzeb led his grand Mughal army against the Deccan Qutbshahi fortress during the siege of Golconda. The Qutbshahis had constructed massive fortifications throughout successive generations on a granite hill over 400 ft high with an enormous eight-mile long wall enclosing the city. The main gates of Golconda had the ability to repulse any war elephant attack. Although the Qutbshahis maintained the impregnability of their walls, at night Aurangzeb and his infantry erected complex scaffolding that allowed them to scale the high walls. During the eight-month siege the Mughals faced many hardships including the death of their experienced commander Kilich Khan Bahadur. Eventually, Aurangzeb and his forces managed to penetrate the walls by capturing a gate, and their entry into the fort led Abul Hasan Qutb Shah to surrender peacefully.

Military equipment

Mughal cannon making skills advanced during the 17th century. One of the most impressive Mughal cannons is known as the Zafarbaksh, which is a very rare composite cannon, that required skills in both wrought-iron forge welding and bronze-casting technologies and the in-depth knowledge of the qualities of both metals.

The Ibrahim Rauza was a famed cannon, which was well known for its multi-barrels. François Bernier, the personal physician to Aurangzeb, observed versatile Mughal gun-carriages each drawn by two horses.

Despite these innovations, most soldiers used bows and arrows, the quality of sword manufacture was so poor that they preferred to use ones imported from England, and the operation of the cannons was entrusted not to Mughals but to European gunners. Other weapons used during the period included rockets, cauldrons of boiling oil, muskets and manjaniqs (stone-throwing catapults).

Infantry who were later called Sepoy and who specialised in siege and artillery emerged during the reign of Aurangzeb.

War elephants
In 1703, the Mughal commander at Coromandel, Daud Khan Panni spent 10,500 coins to purchase 30 to 50 war elephants from Ceylon.

Art and culture
Aurangzeb was noted for his religious piety; he memorized the entire Quran, studied hadiths and stringently observed the rituals of Islam, and "transcribe[d] copies of the Quran."

Aurangzeb had a more austere nature than his predecessors, and greatly reduced imperial patronage of the figurative Mughal miniature. This had the effect of dispersing the court atelier to other regional courts. Being religious he encouraged Islamic calligraphy. His reign also saw the building of the Lahore Badshahi Masjid and Bibi Ka Maqbara in Aurangabad for his wife Rabia-ud-Daurani. Aurangzeb was considered a Mujaddid by contemporary Muslims considered Aurangzeb.

Calligraphy

The Mughal Emperor Aurangzeb is known to have patronised works of Islamic calligraphy; the demand for Quran manuscripts in the naskh style peaked during his reign. Having been instructed by Syed Ali Tabrizi, Aurangzeb was himself a talented calligrapher in naskh, evidenced by Quran manuscripts that he created.

Architecture
Aurangzeb was not as involved in architecture as his father. Under Aurangzeb's rule, the position of the Mughal Emperor as chief architectural patron began to diminish. However, Aurangzeb did endow some significant structures. Catherine Asher terms his architectural period as an "Islamization" of Mughal architecture. One of the earliest constructions after his accession was a small marble mosque known as the Moti Masjid (Pearl Mosque), built for his personal use in the Red Fort complex of Delhi. He later ordered the construction of the Badshahi Mosque in Lahore, which is today one of the largest mosques in the Indian subcontinent. The mosque he constructed in Srinagar is still the largest in Kashmir.

Most of Aurangzeb's building activity revolved around mosques, but secular structures were not neglected. The Bibi Ka Maqbara in Aurangabad, the mausoleum of Rabia-ud-Daurani, was constructed by his eldest son Azam Shah upon Aurangzeb's decree. Its architecture displays clear inspiration from the Taj Mahal. Aurangzeb also provided and repaired urban structures like fortifications (for example a wall around Aurangabad, many of whose gates still survive), bridges, caravanserais, and gardens.

Aurangzeb was more heavily involved in the repair and maintenance of previously existing structures. The most important of these were mosques, both Mughal and pre-Mughal, which he repaired more of than any of his predecessors. He patronised the dargahs of Sufi saints such as Bakhtiyar Kaki, and strived to maintain royal tombs.

Textiles
The textile industry in the Mughal Empire emerged very firmly during the reign of the Mughal Emperor Aurangzeb and was particularly well noted by Francois Bernier, a French physician of the Mughal Emperor. Francois Bernier writes how Karkanahs, or workshops for the artisans, particularly in textiles flourished by "employing hundreds of embroiderers, who were superintended by a master". He further writes how "Artisans manufacture of silk, fine brocade, and other fine muslins, of which are made turbans, robes of gold flowers, and tunics worn by females, so delicately fine as to wear out in one night, and cost even more if they were well embroidered with fine needlework".

He also explains the different techniques employed to produce such complicated textiles such as Himru (whose name is Persian for "brocade"), Paithani (whose pattern is identical on both sides), Mushru (satin weave) and how Kalamkari, in which fabrics are painted or block-printed, was a technique that originally came from Persia. Francois Bernier provided some of the first, impressive descriptions of the designs and the soft, delicate texture of Pashmina shawls also known as Kani, which were very valued for their warmth and comfort among the Mughals, and how these textiles and shawls eventually began to find their way to France and England.

Foreign relations

Aurangzeb sent diplomatic missions to Mecca in 1659 and 1662, with money and gifts for the Sharif. He also sent alms in 1666 and 1672 to be distributed in Mecca and Medina. Historian Naimur Rahman Farooqi writes that, "By 1694, Aurangzeb's ardour for the Sharifs of Mecca had begun to wane; their greed and rapacity had thoroughly disillusioned the Emperor ... Aurangzeb expressed his disgust at the unethical behavior of the Sharif who appropriated all the money sent to the Hijaz for his own use, thus depriving the needy and the poor."

Relations with the Uzbek
Subhan Quli Khan, Balkh's Uzbek ruler was the first to recognise him in 1658 and requested for a general alliance, he worked alongside the new Mughal Emperor since 1647, when Aurangzeb was the Subedar of Balkh.

Relations with the Safavid dynasty
Aurangzeb received the embassy of Abbas II of Persia in 1660 and returned them with gifts. However, relations between the Mughal Empire and the Safavid dynasty were tense because the Persians attacked the Mughal army positioned near Kandahar. Aurangzeb prepared his armies in the Indus River Basin for a counteroffensive, but Abbas II's death in 1666 caused Aurangzeb to end all hostilities. Aurangzeb's rebellious son, Sultan Muhammad Akbar, sought refuge with Suleiman I of Persia, who had rescued him from the Imam of Musqat and later refused to assist him in any military adventures against Aurangzeb.

Relations with the French
In 1667, the French East India Company ambassadors Le Gouz and Bebert presented Louis XIV of France's letter which urged the protection of French merchants from various rebels in the Deccan. In response to the letter, Aurangzeb issued a firman allowing the French to open a factory in Surat.

Relations with the Sultanate of Maldives

In the 1660s, the Sultan of the Maldives, Ibrahim Iskandar I, requested help from Aurangzeb's representative, the Faujdar of Balasore. The Sultan wished to gain his support in possible future expulsions of Dutch and English trading ships, as he was concerned with how they might impact the economy of the Maldives. However, as Aurangzeb did not possess a powerful navy and had no interest in providing support to Ibrahim in a possible future war with the Dutch or English, the request came to nothing.

Relations with the Ottoman Empire
Like his father, Aurangzeb was not willing to acknowledge the Ottoman claim to the caliphate. He often supported the Ottoman Empire's enemies, extending cordial welcome to two rebel Governors of Basra, and granting them and their families a high status in the imperial service. Sultan Suleiman II's friendly postures were ignored by Aurangzeb. The Sultan urged Aurangzeb to wage holy war against Christians.

Relations with the English and the Anglo-Mughal War

In 1686, the East India Company, which had unsuccessfully tried to obtain a firman that would grant them regular trading privileges throughout the Mughal Empire, initiated the Anglo-Mughal War. This war ended in disaster for the English after Aurangzeb in 1689 dispatched a large fleet from Janjira that blockaded Bombay. The ships, commanded by Sidi Yaqub, were manned by Indians and Mappilas. In 1690, realising the war was not going favourably for them, the Company sent envoys to Aurangzeb's camp to plead for a pardon. The company's envoys prostrated themselves before the emperor, agreed pay a large indemnity, and promise to refrain from such actions in the future.

In September 1695, English pirate Henry Every conducted one of the most profitable pirate raids in history with his capture of a Grand Mughal grab convoy near Surat. The Indian ships had been returning home from their annual pilgrimage to Mecca when the pirate struck, capturing the Ganj-i-Sawai, reportedly the largest ship in the Muslim fleet, and its escorts in the process. When news of the capture reached the mainland, a livid Aurangzeb nearly ordered an armed attack against the English-governed city of Bombay, though he finally agreed to compromise after the Company promised to pay financial reparations, estimated at £600,000 by the Mughal authorities. Meanwhile, Aurangzeb shut down four of the English East India Company's factories, imprisoned the workers and captains (who were nearly lynched by a rioting mob), and threatened to put an end to all English trading in India until Every was captured. The Privy Council and East India Company offered a massive bounty for Every's apprehension, leading to the first worldwide manhunt in recorded history. However, Every successfully eluded capture.

In 1702, Aurangzeb sent Daud Khan Panni, the Mughal Empire's Subhedar of the Carnatic region, to besiege and blockade Fort St. George for more than three months. The governor of the fort Thomas Pitt was instructed by the East India Company to sue for peace.

Relations with the Ethiopian Empire 
Ethiopian Emperor Fasilides dispatched an embassy to India in 1664–65 to congratulate Aurangzeb upon his accession to the throne of the Mughal Empire.

Relations with the Tibetans, Uyghurs, and Dzungars 
After 1679, the Tibetans invaded Ladakh, which was in the Mughal sphere of influence. Aurangzeb intervened on Ladakh's behalf in 1683, but his troops retreated before Dzungar reinforcements arrived to bolster the Tibetan position. At the same time, however, a letter was sent from the governor of Kashmir claiming the Mughals had defeated the Dalai Lama and conquered all of Tibet, a cause for celebration in Aurangzeb's court.

Aurangzeb received an embassy from Muhammad Amin Khan of Chagatai Moghulistan in 1690, seeking assistance in driving out "Qirkhiz infidels" (meaning the Buddhist Dzungars), who "had acquired dominance over the country".

Relations with the Czardom of Russia 
Russian Czar Peter the Great requested Aurangzeb to open Russo-Mughal trade relations in the late 17th century. In 1696 Aurangzeb received his envoy, Semyon Malenkiy, and allowed him to conduct free trade. After staying for six years in India, and visiting Surat, Burhanpur, Agra, Delhi and other cities, Russian merchants returned to Moscow with valuable Indian goods.

Administrative reforms

Tribute
Aurangzeb received tribute from all over the Indian subcontinent, using this wealth to establish bases and fortifications in India, particularly in the Carnatic, Deccan, Bengal and Lahore.

Revenue

Aurangzeb's exchequer raised a record £100 million in annual revenue through various sources like taxes, customs and land revenue, et al. from 24 provinces. He had an annual yearly revenue of $450 million, more than ten times that of his contemporary Louis XIV of France.

Coins

Aurangzeb felt that verses from the Quran should not be stamped on coins, as done in former times, because they were constantly touched by the hands and feet of people. His coins had the name of the mint city and the year of issue on one face, and, the following couplet on other:

Rebellions

Traditional and newly coherent social groups in northern and western India, such as the Marathas, Rajputs, Hindu Jats, Pashtuns, and Sikhs, gained military and governing ambitions during Mughal rule, which, through collaboration or opposition, gave them both recognition and military experience.
 In 1669, the Hindu Jat peasants of Bharatpur around Mathura rebelled and created Bharatpur state but were defeated.
 In 1659, Shivaji, launched a surprise attack on the Mughal Viceroy Shaista Khan and, while waging war against Aurangzeb. Shivaji and his forces attacked the Deccan, Janjira and Surat and tried to gain control of vast territories. In 1689, Aurangzeb's armies captured Shivaji's son Sambhaji and executed him. But the Marathas continued the fight.
 In 1679, the Rathore clan under the command of Durgadas Rathore rebelled when Aurangzeb did not give permission to make the young Rathore prince the king and took direct command of Jodhpur. This incident caused great unrest among the Hindu Rajput rulers under Aurangzeb and led to many rebellions in Rajputana, resulting in the loss of Mughal power in the region and religious bitterness over the destruction of temples.
 In 1672, the Satnami, a sect concentrated in an area near Delhi, under the leadership of Bhirbhan, took over the administration of Narnaul, but they were eventually crushed upon Aurangzeb's personal intervention with very few escaping alive.
 In 1671, the battle of Saraighat was fought in the easternmost regions of the Mughal Empire against the Ahom Kingdom. The Mughals led by Mir Jumla II and Shaista Khan attacked and were defeated by the Ahoms.
 Maharaja Chhatrasal was a medieval Indian warrior from Bundela Rajput clan, who fought against the Mughal Emperor Aurangzeb, and established his own kingdom in Bundelkhand, becoming a Maharaja of Panna.

Jat rebellion

In 1669, Hindu Jats began to organise a rebellion that is believed to have been caused by the re-imposition of jizya and destruction of Hindu temples in Mathura. The Jats were led by Gokula, a rebel landholder from Tilpat. By the year 1670 20,000 Jat rebels were quelled and the Mughal Army took control of Tilpat, Gokula's personal fortune amounted to 93,000 gold coins and hundreds of thousands of silver coins.

Gokula was caught and executed. But the Jats once again attempted began their rebellion. Raja Ram Jat, in order to avenge his father Gokula's death, plundered Akbar's tomb of its gold, silver and fine carpets, opened Akbar's grave and dragged his bones and burned them in retaliation. Jats also shot off the tops of the minarets on the gateway to Akbar's Tomb and melted down two silver doors from the Taj Mahal. Aurangzeb appointed Mohammad Bidar Bakht as commander to crush the Jat rebellion. On 4 July 1688, Raja Ram Jat was captured and beheaded. His head was sent to Aurangzeb as proof.

However, after Aurangeb's death, Jats under Badan Singh later established their independent state of Bharatpur.

Mughal–Maratha Wars

In 1657, while Aurangzeb attacked Golconda and Bijapur in the Deccan, the Hindu Maratha warrior, Shivaji, used guerrilla tactics to take control of three Adil Shahi forts formerly under his father's command. With these victories, Shivaji assumed de facto leadership of many independent Maratha clans. The Marathas harried the flanks of the warring Adil Shahis, gaining weapons, forts, and territory. Shivaji's small and ill-equipped army survived an all out Adil Shahi attack, and Shivaji personally killed the Adil Shahi general, Afzal Khan. With this event, the Marathas transformed into a powerful military force, capturing more and more Adil Shahi territories. Shivaji went on to neutralise Mughal power in the region.

In 1659, Aurangzeb sent his trusted general and maternal uncle Shaista Khan, the Wali in Golconda to recover forts lost to the Maratha rebels. Shaista Khan drove into Maratha territory and took up residence in Pune. But in a daring raid on the governor's palace in Pune during a midnight wedding celebration, led by Shivaji himself, the Marathas killed Shaista Khan's son and Shivaji maimed Shaista Khan by cutting off three fingers of his hand. Shaista Khan, however, survived and was re-appointed the administrator of Bengal going on to become a key commander in the war against the Ahoms.

Aurangzeb next sent general Raja Jai Singh to vanquish the Marathas. Jai Singh besieged the fort of Purandar and fought off all attempts to relieve it. Foreseeing defeat, Shivaji agreed to terms. Jai Singh persuaded Shivaji to visit Aurangzeb at Agra, giving him a personal guarantee of safety. Their meeting at the Mughal court did not go well, however. Shivaji felt slighted at the way he was received, and insulted Aurangzeb by refusing imperial service. For this affront he was detained, but managed to effect a daring escape.

Shivaji returned to the Deccan, and crowned himself Chhatrapati or the ruler of the Maratha Kingdom in 1674. Shivaji expanded Maratha control throughout the Deccan until his death in 1680. Shivaji was succeeded by his son, Sambhaji. Militarily and politically, Mughal efforts to control the Deccan continued to fail.

On the other hand, Aurangzeb's third son Akbar left the Mughal court along with a few Muslim Mansabdar supporters and joined Muslim rebels in the Deccan. Aurangzeb in response moved his court to Aurangabad and took over command of the Deccan campaign. The rebels were defeated and Akbar fled south to seek refuge with Sambhaji, Shivaji's successor. More battles ensued, and Akbar fled to Persia and never returned.

In 1689, Aurangzeb's forces captured and executed Sambhaji. His successor Rajaram, later Rajaram's widow Tarabai and their Maratha forces fought individual battles against the forces of the Mughal Empire. Territory changed hands repeatedly during the years (1689–1707) of interminable warfare . As there was no central authority among the Marathas, Aurangzeb was forced to contest every inch of territory, at great cost in lives and money. Even as Aurangzeb drove west, deep into Maratha territory – notably conquering Satara — the Marathas expanded eastwards into Mughal lands – Malwa and Hyderabad. The Marathas also expanded further South into Southern India defeating the independent local rulers there capturing Jinji in Tamil Nadu. Aurangzeb waged continuous war in the Deccan for more than two decades with no resolution. He thus lost about a fifth of his army fighting rebellions led by the Marathas in Deccan India. He travelled a long distance to the Deccan to conquer the Marathas and eventually died at the age of 88, still fighting the Marathas.

Aurangzeb's shift from conventional warfare to anti-insurgency in the Deccan region shifted the paradigm of Mughal military thought. There were conflicts between Marathas and Mughals in Pune, Jinji, Malwa and Vadodara. The Mughal Empire's port city of Surat was sacked twice by the Marathas during the reign of Aurangzeb and the valuable port was in ruins.
Matthew White estimates that about 2.5 million of Aurangzeb's army were killed during the Mughal–Maratha Wars (100,000 annually during a quarter-century), while 2 million civilians in war-torn lands died due to drought, plague and famine.

Ahom campaign

While Aurangzeb and his brother Shah Shuja had been fighting against each other, the Hindu rulers of Kuch Behar and Assam took advantage of the disturbed conditions in the Mughal Empire, had invaded imperial dominions. For three years they were not attacked, but in 1660 Mir Jumla II, the viceroy of Bengal, was ordered to recover the lost territories.

The Mughals set out in November 1661. Within weeks they occupied the capital of Kuch Behar, which they annexed. Leaving a detachment to garrison it, the Mughal army began to retake their territories in Assam. Mir Jumla II advanced on Garhgaon, the capital of the Ahom kingdom, and reached it on 17 March 1662. The ruler, Raja Sutamla, had fled before his approach. The Mughals captured 82 elephants, 300,000 rupees in cash, 1000 ships, and 173 stores of rice.

On his way back to Dacca, in March 1663, Mir Jumla II died of natural causes. Skirmishes continued between the Mughals and Ahoms after the rise of Chakradhwaj Singha, who refused to pay further indemnity to the Mughals and during the wars that continued the Mughals suffered great hardships. Munnawar Khan emerged as a leading figure and is known to have supplied food to vulnerable Mughal forces in the region near Mathurapur. Although the Mughals under the command of Syed Firoz Khan the Faujdar at Guwahati were overrun by two Ahom armies in 1667, but they continued to hold and maintain presence in their eastern territories even after the battle of Saraighat in 1671.

The battle of Saraighat was fought in 1671 between the Mughal empire (led by the Kachwaha king, Raja Ramsingh I), and the Ahom Kingdom (led by Lachit Borphukan) on the Brahmaputra river at Saraighat, now in Guwahati. Although much weaker, the Ahom Army defeated the Mughal Army by brilliant uses of the terrain, clever diplomatic negotiations to buy time, guerrilla tactics, psychological warfare, military intelligence and by exploiting the sole weakness of the Mughal forces—its navy.

The battle of Saraighat was the last battle in the last major attempt by the Mughals to extend their empire into Assam. Though the Mughals managed to regain Guwahati briefly after a later Borphukan deserted it, the Ahoms wrested control in the battle of Itakhuli in 1682 and maintained it till the end of their rule.

Satnami opposition

In May 1672, the Satnami sect obeying the commandments of an "old toothless woman" (according to Mughal accounts) organised a massive revolt in the agricultural heartlands of the Mughal Empire. The Satnamis were known to have shaved off their heads and even eyebrows and had temples in many regions of Northern India. They began a large-scale rebellion 75 miles southwest of Delhi.

The Satnamis believed they were invulnerable to Mughal bullets and believed they could multiply in any region they entered. The Satnamis initiated their march upon Delhi and overran small-scale Mughal infantry units.

Aurangzeb responded by organising a Mughal army of 10,000 troops and artillery, and dispatched detachments of his own personal Mughal imperial guards to carry out several tasks. To boost Mughal morale, Aurangzeb wrote Islamic prayers, made amulets, and drew designs that would become emblems in the Mughal Army. This rebellion would have a serious aftermath effect on the Punjab.

Sikh opposition

The ninth Sikh Guru, Guru Tegh Bahadur, like his predecessors was opposed to forced conversion of the local population as he considered it wrong. Approached by Kashmiri Pandits to help them retain their faith and avoid forced religious conversions, Guru Tegh Bahadur sent a message to the emperor that if he could convert Teg Bagadur to Islam, every Hindu will become a Muslim. In response, Aurangzeb ordered arrest of the Guru. He was then brought to Delhi and tortured so as to convert him. On his refusal to convert, he was beheaded in 1675.

In response, Guru Tegh Bahadur's son and successor, Guru Gobind Singh, further militarised his followers, starting with the establishment of Khalsa in 1699, eight years before Aurangzeb's death. In 1705, Guru Gobind Singh sent a letter entitled Zafarnamah, which accused Aurangzeb of cruelty and betraying Islam. The letter caused him much distress and remorse. Guru Gobind Singh's formation of Khalsa in 1699 led to the establishment of the Sikh Confederacy and later Sikh Empire.

Pashtun opposition

The Pashtun revolt in 1672 under the leadership of the warrior poet Khushal Khan Khattak of Kabul, was triggered when soldiers under the orders of the Mughal Governor Amir Khan allegedly molested women of the Pashtun tribes in modern-day Kunar Province of Afghanistan. The Safi tribes retaliated against the soldiers. This attack provoked a reprisal, which triggered a general revolt of most of tribes. Attempting to reassert his authority, Amir Khan led a large Mughal Army to the Khyber Pass, where the army was surrounded by tribesmen and routed, with only four men, including the Governor, managing to escape.

Aurangzeb's incursions into the Pashtun areas were described by Khushal Khan Khattak as "Black is the Mughal's heart towards all of us Pathans". Aurangzeb employed the scorched earth policy, sending soldiers who massacred, looted and burnt many villages. Aurangzeb also proceeded to use bribery to turn the Pashtun tribes against each other, with the aim that they would distract a unified Pashtun challenge to Mughal authority, and the impact of this was to leave a lasting legacy of mistrust among the tribes.

After that the revolt spread, with the Mughals suffering a near total collapse of their authority in the Pashtun belt. The closure of the important Attock-Kabul trade route along the Grand Trunk road was particularly disastrous. By 1674, the situation had deteriorated to a point where Aurangzeb camped at Attock to personally take charge. Switching to diplomacy and bribery along with force of arms, the Mughals eventually split the rebels and partially suppressed the revolt, although they never managed to wield effective authority outside the main trade route.

Death

By 1689, the conquest of Golconda, Mughal victories in the south expanded the Mughal Empire to 4 million square kilometres, with a population estimated to be over 158 million. But this supremacy was short-lived. Jos Gommans, Professor of Colonial and Global History at the University of Leiden, says that "... the highpoint of imperial centralisation under emperor Aurangzeb coincided with the start of the imperial downfall."

Aurangzeb constructed a small marble mosque known as the Moti Masjid (Pearl Mosque) in the Red Fort complex in Delhi. However, his constant warfare, especially with the Marathas, drove his empire to the brink of bankruptcy just as much as the wasteful personal spending and opulence of his predecessors.

The Indologist Stanley Wolpert, emeritus professor at UCLA, says that:

Even when ill and dying, Aurangzeb made sure that the populace knew he was still alive, for if they had thought otherwise then the turmoil of another war of succession was likely. He died at his military camp in Bhingar near Ahmednagar on 3 March 1707 at the age of 88, having outlived many of his children. He had only 300 rupees with him which were later given to charity as per his instructions and he prior to his death requested not to spend extravagantly on his funeral but to keep it simple. His modest open-air grave in Khuldabad, Aurangabad, Maharashtra expresses his deep devotion to his Islamic beliefs. It is sited in the courtyard of the shrine of the Sufi saint Shaikh Burhan-u'd-din Gharib, who was a disciple of Nizamuddin Auliya of Delhi.

Brown writes that after his death, "a string of weak emperors, wars of succession, and coups by noblemen heralded the irrevocable weakening of Mughal power". She notes that the populist but "fairly old-fashioned" explanation for the decline is that there was a reaction to Aurangzeb's oppression. Although Aurangzeb died without appointing a successor, he instructed his three sons to divide the empire among themselves. His sons failed to reach a satisfactory agreement and fought against each other in a war of succession. Aurangzeb's immediate successor was his third son Azam Shah, who was defeated and killed in June 1707 at the battle of Jajau by the army of Bahadur Shah I, the second son of Aurangzeb. Both because of Aurangzeb's over-extension and because of Bahadur Shah's weak military and leadership qualities, entered a period of terminal decline. Immediately after Bahadur Shah occupied the throne, the Maratha Empire – which Aurangzeb had held at bay, inflicting high human and monetary costs even on his own empire – consolidated and launched effective invasions of Mughal territory, seizing power from the weak emperor. Within decades of Aurangzeb's death, the Mughal Emperor had little power beyond the walls of Delhi.

Assessments and legacy
Aurangzeb's rule has been the subject of praise, though he has also been described as the most controversial ruler in Indian history. During his lifetime, victories in the south expanded the Mughal Empire to 4 million square kilometres, and he ruled over a population estimated to be over 158 million subjects. His critics argue that his ruthlessness and religious bigotry made him unsuitable to rule the mixed population of his empire.  Some critics assert that the persecution of Shias, Sufis and non-Muslims to impose practices of orthodox Islamic state, such as imposition of sharia and jizya religious tax on non-Muslims, doubling of custom duties on Hindus while abolishing it for Muslims, executions of Muslims and non-Muslims alike, and destruction of temples eventually led to numerous rebellions. G. N. Moin Shakir and Sarma Festschrift argue that he often used political opposition as pretext for religious persecution, and that, as a result, groups of Jats, Marathas, Sikhs, Satnamis and Pashtuns rose against him.

Multiple interpretations of Aurangzeb's life and reign over the years by critics have led to a very complicated legacy. Some argue that his policies abandoned his predecessors' legacy of pluralism and religious tolerance, citing his introduction of the jizya tax and other policies based on Islamic ethics; his demolition of Hindu temples; the executions of his elder brother Dara Shikoh, King Sambhaji of Maratha and Sikh Guru Tegh Bahadur and the prohibition and supervision of behaviour and activities that are forbidden in Islam such as gambling, fornication, and consumption of alcohol and narcotics. At the same time, some historians question the historical authenticity of the claims of his critics, arguing that his destruction of temples has been exaggerated, and noting that he built more temples than he destroyed, paid for their maintenance, employed significantly more Hindus in his imperial bureaucracy than his predecessors, and opposed bigotry against Hindus and Shia Muslims.

In Pakistan, author Haroon Khalid writes that, "Aurangzeb is presented as a hero who fought and expanded the frontiers of the Islamic empire" and "is imagined to be a true believer who removed corrupt practices from religion and the court, and once again purified the empire." The academic Munis Faruqui also opines that the "Pakistani state and its allies in the religious and political establishments include him in the pantheon of premodern Muslim heroes, especially lauding him for his militarism, personal piety, and seeming willingness to accommodate Islamic morality within state goals."

Muhammad Iqbal, considered the spiritual founder of Pakistan, compared him favorably to the prophet Abraham for his warfare against Akbar's Din-i Ilahi and idolatry, while Iqbal Singh Sevea, in his book on the political philosophy of the thinker, says that "Iqbal considered that the life and activities of Aurangzeb constituted the starting point of Muslim nationality in India." Maulana Shabbir Ahmad Usmani, in his funeral oration, hailed M.A. Jinnah, the founder of Pakistan, to be the greatest Muslim since Aurangzeb. Pakistani-American academic Akbar Ahmed described President Zia-ul-Haq, known for his Islamization drive, as "conceptually ... a spiritual descendent of Aurangzeb" because Zia had an orthodox, legalistic view of Islam.

Beyond the individual appreciations, Aurangzeb is seminal to Pakistan's national self-consciousness, as historian Ayesha Jalal, while referring to the Pakistani textbooks controversy, mentions M. D. Zafar's A Text Book of Pakistan Studies where we can read that, under Aurangzeb, "Pakistan spirit gathered in strength", while his death "weakened the Pakistan spirit." Another historian from Pakistan, Mubarak Ali, also looking at the textbooks, and while noting that Akbar "is conveniently ignored and not mentioned in any school textbook from class one to matriculation", contrasts him with Aurangzeb, who "appears in different textbooks of Social Studies and Urdu language as an orthodox and pious Muslim copying the Holy Quran and sewing caps for his livelihood."

This image of Aurangzeb is not limited to Pakistan's official historiography. Historian Audrey Truschke points out that BJP and other Hindu nationalists regard him as Muslim zealot. Nehru claimed that, due to his reversal of the cultural and religious syncretism of the previous Mughal emperors, Aurangzeb acted "more as a Moslem than an Indian ruler".

Full title 
The epithet Aurangzeb means 'Ornament of the Throne'. His chosen title Alamgir translates to Conqueror of the World.

Aurangzeb's full imperial title was:

Al-Sultan al-Azam wal Khaqan al-Mukarram Hazrat Abul Muzaffar Muhy-ud-Din Muhammad Aurangzeb Bahadur Alamgir I,
Badshah Ghazi,
Shahanshah-e-Sultanat-ul-Hindiya Wal Mughaliya.

Aurangzeb had also been attributed various other titles including Caliph of The Merciful, Monarch of Islam, and Living Custodian of God.

Literature 
Aurangzeb has prominently featured in the following books
 1675 – Aureng-zebe, play by John Dryden, written and performed on the London stage during the Emperor's lifetime.
 19?? – Hindi fiction novel by Acharya Chatursen Shastri
 1970 – Shahenshah, the Marathi fictional biography by N S Inamdar; translated into English in 2017 by Vikrant Pande as Shahenshah – The Life of Aurangzeb
 2017 – 1636: Mission to the Mughals, by Eric Flint and Griffin Barber
 2018 – Aurangzeb: The Man and the Myth, by Audrey Truschke

See also
 Flags of the Mughal Empire
 Mughal architecture
 Mughal weapons
 List of largest empires

Notes

Citations

Bibliography

Further reading
 
 
 Muḥammad Bakhtāvar Khān. Mir'at al-'Alam: History of Emperor Awangzeb Alamgir. Trans. Sajida Alvi. Lahore: Idārah-ʾi Taḥqīqāt-i Pākistan, 1979.
 
 
 
 
 Sarkar, Jadunath (1972). History of Aurangzib. Bombay: Orient Longman.
 Delhi, Khushwant Singh, Penguin USA, Open Market Ed edition, 5 February 2000.
  Also published as 
 A Short History of Pakistan, Dr. Ishtiaque Hussain Qureshi, University of Karachi Press.

External links

 Aurangzeb, as he was according to Mughal Records
 Article on Aurganzeb from MANAS group page, UCLA
 The great Aurangzeb is everybody's least favourite Mughal – Audrey Truschke | Aeon Essays by Audrey Truschke, published on AEON
 The Tragedy of Aureng-zebe Text of John Dryden's drama, based loosely on Aurangzeb and the Mughal court, 1675
 Coins of Aurangzeb
 Life of Auranzeb in Urdu (ebook)

Tables 

Sunni Muslims
Sunni Sufis
Hanafis
Maturidis
Mujaddid
Mughal emperors
17th-century Indian Muslims
18th-century Indian Muslims
People from Dahod district
17th-century Indian monarchs
18th-century Indian monarchs
Subahdars of Gujarat
Indian people of Iranian descent
1618 births
1707 deaths